In gas chromatography, the Kovats retention index (shorter Kovats index, retention index; plural retention indices) is used to convert retention times into system-independent constants. The index is named after the Hungarian-born Swiss chemist Ervin Kováts, who outlined the concept in the 1950s while performing research into the composition of the essential oils.

The retention index of a chemical compound is retention time interpolated between adjacent n-alkanes. While retention times vary with the individual chromatographic system (e.g. with regards to column length, film thickness, diameter and inlet pressure), the derived retention indices are quite independent of these parameters and allow comparing values measured by different analytical laboratories under varying conditions and analysis times from seconds to hours. Tables of retention indices are used to identify peaks by comparing measured retention indices with the tabulated values.

Isothermal Kovats retention index
The Kovats index applies to organic compounds. The method interpolates peaks between bracketing n-alkanes. The Kovats index of n-alkanes is 100 times their carbon number, e.g. the Kovats index of n-butane is 400. The Kovats index is dimensionless, unlike retention time or retention volume. For isothermal gas chromatography, the Kovats index is given by the equation:

where the variables used are:
 , the Kováts retention index of peak i
 , the carbon number of n-alkane peak heading peak i
 , the retention time of compound i, minutes
 , the air peak, void time in average velocity , minutes

The Kovats index also applies to packed columns with an equivalent equation:

Kovats index and physical properties
Compounds elute in the carrier gas phase only. Compounds solved in the stationary phase stay put. The ratio of gas time  and residence time  in the stationary liquid polymer phase is called the capacity factor :

where the variables used are:
  gas constant (8.314J/mole/k)
  temperature [k] 
  solubility of compound i in polymer stationary phase [mole/m3]
  vapor pressure of pure liquid i [Pa]

Capillary tubes with uniform coatings have this phase ratio β:
 
Capillary inner diameter  is well defined but film thickness  reduces by bleed and thermal breakdown that occur after column heating over time, depending on chemical bonding to the silica glass wall and polymer cross-linking of the stationary phase. 
Above capacity factor  can be expressed explicit for retention time: 
 
Retention time  is shorter by reduced  over column life time. Column length  is introduced with average gas velocity : 
 
However, warmer columns ↑ do not have longer  but shorter, following temperature programming experience. Pure liquid vapor pressure  rises exponentially with  so that we do get shorter  warming the column ↑.
Isothermal Kovats index in terms of the physical properties becomes:

Isothermal Kovats index is based on solubility  and vapor pressure  of compound i and n-Alkanes.  dependence depends on the compound compared to the n-alkanes.
Isothermal Kovats indices of hydrocarbon were measured by Axel Lubeck and Donald Sutton.

Temperature-programmed Kovats index
IUPAC defines the temperature programmed chromatography Kovats index equation:

 &  retention times of trailing and heading n-alkanes, respectively.

NOTE: TPGC index does depend on temperature program, gas velocity and the column used !

ASTM method D6730 defines the temperature programmed chromatography Kovats index equation:

Measured Kovats retention index values can be found in ASTM method D 6730 databases.
An extensive Kovats index database is compiled by NIST .

The equations produce significant different Kovats indices.

Method translation
Faster GC methods have shorter times but Kovats indexes of the compounds may be conserved if proper method translation is applied.
Temperatures of the temperature program stay the same, but ramps and times change when using a smaller column or faster carrier gas.  
If column dimensions Length×diameter×film are divided by 2 and gas velocity is doubled by using H2 in place of He, the hold times must be divided by 4 and the ramps must be multiplied by 4 to keep the same index and the same retention temperature for the same compound analyzed. Method translation rules are incorporated in some chromatography data systems.

References

Chromatography
Analytical chemistry
Hungarian inventions
Hungarian inventors
Hungarian scientists